Aleimma is a genus of moths belonging to the subfamily Tortricinae of the family Tortricidae.

Species
Aleimma loeflingiana (Linnaeus, 1758)

See also
List of Tortricidae genera

References

 , 2005: World Catalogue of Insects vol. 5 Tortricidae.
 , 1816, Verz. bekannter Schmett.: 391.
 , 2010: Lepidoptera Tortricidae from SE European Russia with description of Ceratoxanthis saratovica sp. n. Journal of Entomological and Acarological Research Serie II 42 (1): 19–26.

External links

tortricidae.com

Tortricini
Monotypic moth genera
Tortricidae genera